Augmented Browsing
Web software
Web browsers